Devens may refer to:

Geography 
 Fort Devens, inactive United States Army military installation
 Federal Medical Center, Devens, federal prison in Massachusetts
 Devens, Massachusetts, regional enterprise zone and census-designated place in Massachusetts

People
 Devens (name), list of people with the name